Sir William Laurence Young, 4th Baronet (29 September 1806 – 27 June 1842) was a British Conservative politician.

Young was elected Conservative Member of Parliament for Buckinghamshire at the 1835 and held the seat until his death in 1842.

References

External links
 

UK MPs 1835–1837
UK MPs 1837–1841
UK MPs 1841–1847
Conservative Party (UK) MPs for English constituencies
1806 births
1842 deaths
Baronets in the Baronetage of Great Britain